Schodde's bird of paradise  is a bird in the family Paradisaeidae that is an intergeneric hybrid between a Lawes's parotia and blue bird-of-paradise.

History
Only one specimen, an adult female, is known of this hybrid.  It is held in the Australian Museum and comes from Trepikama in the Baiyer Valley of Papua New Guinea.  It was named by Clifford and Dawn Frith after Australian ornithologist Richard Schodde.

Notes

References
 

Hybrid birds of paradise
Birds of New Guinea
Intergeneric hybrids